This is a list of the largest rodents.

See also 

 List of largest mammals

References 

Rodents by classification
Rodents
Rodent anatomy